Winnebago can refer to:

 The exonym of the Ho-Chunk tribe of Native North Americans with reservations in Nebraska, Iowa, and Wisconsin
 Winnebago Tribe of Nebraska, a federally recognized tribe group in the state
 The Winnebago language of the Ho-Chunk (Winnebago) tribe
 Winnebago (chicken), a 19th-century American chicken breed
 Winnebago Council Boy Scout Council
 Winnebago Industries, a manufacturer of recreational vehicles and motor homes based in Forest City, Iowa

Places 

 Lake Winnebago in eastern Wisconsin
 The Winnebago Pool, a group of interconnected lakes in eastern Wisconsin
 Winnebago Scout Reservation, a Boy Scout camp in Rockaway, New Jersey

Communities 
 Winnebago, Illinois
 Winnebago, Minnesota
 Winnebago, Nebraska
 Winnebago, Wisconsin
 Winnebago Mission, Wisconsin

See also 
 Winnebago County (disambiguation)
 Winnebago Township (disambiguation)